Erg Chigaga (or Erg Chegaga, Berber: ⴻⵔⴳ ⵛⴳⵉⴳⴰ,  or Edaya el-Hamra) is the largest and still untouched of the major ergs in Morocco, the other is Erg Chebbi near Merzouga.

This erg made of beautiful dunes is located in the Drâa-Tafilalet area about 45 km west of the small rural oasis town of M'Hamid El Ghizlane, itself located about 98 km south of the town of Zagora. Some dunes are over 50m above the surrounding landscape and with an area of approximately 35 km by 15 km, it is the largest and wildest erg of Morocco.

The north border is represented by Djebel Bani, the east border is represented by M'Hamid Hammada. At south-east it is located the Erg Smar adjacent to Erg Ezzahar. At west it is located the Iriki Lake, a dried lake now set Iriqui National Park since 1994.

Because it is relatively difficult to access, Erg Chigaga remains significantly less visited than Erg Chebbi. For this reason Erg Chigaga is considered more romantic and overall reputed a beloved set by purists and artists like landscape painters and fineart photographers.

Starting from the oasis of M'Hamid El Ghizlane it is possible to reach the dunes area, by off-road vehicle, by camel and by off-road motorbike along an old caravan trail, however the approach route is not obvious and unless you have a GPS navigation system and relevant waypoints you are advised to engage a local guide.
Erg Chigaga map

Curiosity
In 2018, Erg Chigaga Desert was the site of an extreme sports record from Italian runner Stefano Miglietti. In November 2018, Miglietti crossed the desert by foot, taking only 4 days and 10 hours to cover a trail of around 500 km. He has crossed 4 Erg of dunes (Erg Smar, Erg Ezzahar, Erg Chegaga, Erg Lihoudi), 2 Hammada (rocky plateaux), running also along the dried Draa River and crossing also the arid Iriki Lake. Tribes people have received the runner at M'Hamid's Kasbah.

External links
Crossing the deserts in the land of M'Hamid's Tribes (2018) Stefano Miglietti, Avventurando. 
 Morocco Travel Guide, Lonely Planet (2017) Morocco, p. 25, 125, 127. Lonely Planet Publications Pty Ltd. Authors: Jessica Lee, Brett Atkinson, Paul Clammer, Virginia Maxwell, Regis St Louis, Lorna Parkes .
 The crossing of Erg Chegaga (2018) Morocco, Extreme Marathon in the land of Taragalte.
 Stefano Miglietti, the ultra runner conquers six deserts Morocco, Extreme Marathon in the Erg Chegaga and 5 deserts.

Sahara
Ergs of Africa
Landforms of Morocco
Zagora Province